Bill Fox may refer to:
 Bill Fox (goldminer) (1827–1890), New Zealand gold prospector and miner
 Bill Fox (musician), American musician with The Mice 
 Bill Fox (politician) (1899–1994), New Zealand Labour Party politician
 Bill Fox (baseball) (1872–1946), Major League Baseball infielder

See also
William Fox (disambiguation)
Billy Fox (disambiguation)